Hollis Bristol is a former Saint Lucian cricketer who played for the Windward Islands in West Indian domestic cricket. He played as a right-handed opening batsman.

Bristol made his first-class debut in February 1967, playing against Trinidad and Tobago during the 1966–67 Shell Shield season. The following month, in a friendly against the Leeward Islands, he scored 86 runs opening the batting with Henry Elwin, making what was to be his highest first-class score. In March 1968, Bristol was appointed captain of the Windwards for a one-off match against the touring English team, played at his home ground (Victoria Park, Castries). He was the first Saint Lucian to captain the team, but did not play again at first-class level.

References

External links
 Player profile and statistics at CricketArchive
 Player profile and statistics at ESPNcricinfo

living people
Saint Lucian cricketers
Windward Islands cricketers
year of birth missing (living people)